Huh Chang-soo (born October 6, 1948) is the chairman of GS Group. Huh has a degree in business administration from Korea University and attended an MBA course at Saint Louis University in the United States.

Huh became chairman of GS Group in 2004 and he has been chairman of FC Seoul since 1998. He is notorious among football fans for being stingy and refusing to spend money on transfers despite FC Seoul being one of the richest teams in Korea.

References

External links
 GS Group Website Chairman Profile Page
 Huh Chang-soo at Fobes.com

1948 births
Living people
Saint Louis University alumni
South Korean businesspeople
South Korean Roman Catholics
South Korean billionaires
GS Group
Chairmen and investors of football clubs in South Korea 
FC Seoul directors and chairmen
South Korean football chairmen and investors
Gimhae Heo clan